Cylaces or Glak (misspelled  in the manuscripts of Faustus of Byzantium's history) was a 4th-century Armenian eunuch who occupied the office of  (grand chamberlain). He initially defected to the Sasanian side during Shapur II's invasion of Armenia, but later rejoined the Armenians in 368 and fought Shapur II's forces. In 370, he sent messengers to Shapur II, promising him to betray the Armenian king Pap. However, this ploy was discovered by Pap, who had Cylaces assassinated.

In Faustus of Byzantium's History of Armenia, Cylaces is split into two characters, both of whom are executed on Pap's orders: an unnamed  who is executed for insulting Pap's mother Parandzem, and another one named Glak who is executed for conspiring with the Persians.

References

Sources 
 
 

Armenian nobility
4th-century Armenian people
Ancient Armenian generals
Generals of Shapur II
370 deaths